XHANV-FM is a radio station on 90.9 FM in Autlán de Navarro, Jalisco. The station is known as Fiesta Mexicana with a grupera format.

History
XHANV received its concession on September 26, 1997. It originally broadcast on 104.9 MHz.

References

Radio stations in Jalisco